The 1965 winners of the Torneo di Viareggio (in English, the Viareggio Tournament, officially the Viareggio Cup World Football Tournament Coppa Carnevale), the annual youth football tournament held in Viareggio, Tuscany, are listed below.

Format
The 16 teams are organized in knockout rounds. The round of 16 are played in two-legs, while the rest of the rounds are single tie.

Participating teams

Italian teams

  Bologna
  Fiorentina
  Genoa
  Inter Milan
  Juventus
  Lazio
  Milan
  Torino

European teams

  Austria Wien
  Dukla Praha
  Crvena zvezda
  Augsburg
  Gand
  Toulon
  Ferencváros
  Dinamo Zagreb

Tournament fixtures

Champions

Footnotes

External links
 Official Site (Italian)
 Results on RSSSF.com

1965
1964–65 in Italian football
1964–65 in Yugoslav football
1964–65 in Hungarian football
1964–65 in German football
1964–65 in Czechoslovak football
1964–65 in French football
1964–65 in Belgian football
1964–65 in Austrian football